Postal codes in Austria were introduced in 1966 and consist of four digits.

System 
The first indicates the state:
 1xxx: Vienna
 2xxx: Lower Austria (east of Vienna)
 3xxx: Lower Austria (west of Vienna)
 4xxx: Upper Austria
 5xxx: Salzburg and west Upper Austria
 6xxx: Tyrol and Vorarlberg (without East Tyrol)
 7xxx: Burgenland
 8xxx: Styria
 9xxx: Carinthia and East Tyrol

The second number indicates the regional area in the state, the third number is for the routing allocation, following railways and post car routes and the fourth number indicates the post office. Every post office has its own number. There are some exceptions to this rule: In Vienna, the second and third numbers show the district, so 1120 would be the twelfth district. Also, some cities close to the German border in Vorarlberg have Austrian and German postcodes.

There are also some special post codes: the airport has its own post code (1300), the UN (1400) and some big companies also have their own post code, for example the ORF, the Austrian National Broadcasting Service (1136). These special post codes are not listed in the public phonebook, though there is a book which contains them and can be bought at an Austrian post office.

External links 
 Postal Codes Austria in XML, JSON and CSV format

Notes and references

See also

Austria
Postal system of Austria